LPH may refer to

La Palma Intercommunity Hospital, in La Palma, California.
Landing Platform Helicopter
Left posterior hemiblock, a cardiovascular disease
Liberal Party of Honduras
β-lipotropin, a hormone
Ankh wedja seneb, often abbreviated as L.P.H. in Egyptological translation
Los Pollos Hermanos, a fictional fast-food restaurant chain that specializes in fried chicken operating across the southwestern United States in the AMC crime dramas, Breaking Bad and Better Call Saul
Low pressure hydrocephalus